William Taylor "Tay" Garnett (June 13, 1894 – October 3, 1977) was an American film director and writer.

Biography

Early life
Born in Los Angeles, Garnett attended the Massachusetts Institute of Technology and served as a naval aviator in World War I.

Mack Sennett
He entered the film industry as a screenwriter in 1920, writing for Mack Sennett. His credits included The Quack Doctor (1920).

He wrote the feature Broken Chains (1922) for Sam Goldwyn and The Hottentot (1920) for Thomas Ince.

Comedy shorts
Garnett went to work for Hal Roach for whom he wrote Don't Park There (1924). He did some with Stan Laurel: A Mandarin Mixup (1924), and Detained (1924).

He wrote Galloping Bungalows (1924) for Billy Bevan and Mac Sennett, Off His Trolley (1924) for Sennett, West of Hot Dog (1924) with Laurel and Hardy, and The Plumber (1924) for Sennett.

Garnett directed some shorts, such as Fast Black (1924), Riders of the Kitchen Range (1925), and All Wool (1925).

He wrote the comedy shorts Honeymoon Hardships (1925), Somewhere in Wrong (1925) with Laurel, Twins (1925) with Laurel, Pie-Eyed (1925) with Laurel, The Snow Hawk (1925) with Laurel, Navy Blue Days (1925) with Laurel, Hold Tight (1925), The Sleuth (1925) with Laurel, Dr. Pyckle and Mr. Pryde (1925) with Laurel, No Sleep on the Deep (1925), Three Wise Goofs, Salute (1925), On the Links (1925), Who's Your Friend (1925), The Funnymooners (1926), Puppy Lovetime (1926), Smith's Visitor (1926), and A Beauty Parlor (1926).

Screenwriting features
Garnett wrote the feature That's My Baby (1926) for William Beaudine at Paramount; Up in Mabel's Room (1926), adapting a stage farce, with Marie Prevost; The Strong Man (1926), starring Harry Langdon and directed by Frank Capra, his first feature as director; and There You Are! (1926), with Conrad Nagel.

Garnett wrote two films produced by Cecil B. De Mille: The Cruise of the Jasper B  (1926), and Rubber Tires (1927).

He adapted another stage farce with Marie Prevost, Getting Gertie's Garter (1927), and also wrote White Gold (1927), Long Pants (1927) for Capra and Langdon, No Control (1927), The Wise Wife (1927).

He did two for De Mille, Turkish Delight (1927) and Skyscraper (1928), and two starring William Boyd, The Cop (1928), and Power (1928).

He joined Pathé.

Pathe/RKO
Garnett's first feature as director was Celebrity (1928), which he also co wrote.

He directed and wrote The Spellbinker (1928), The Flying Fool (1929) with William Boyd, No Brakes (1929), and Her Man (1930) with Helen Twelvetrees. He just directed Officer O'Brien (1930).

Pathe merged into RKO and Garnett went there. He wrote and directed Bad Company (1931) with Twelvetrees, and Prestige (1931), and just directed Panama Flo (1932) with Twelvetrees.

Universal
He went to  Universal to make The Penalty of Fame (1932). Garnett had a big success at Warner Bros with One Way Passage (1932).

At Universal he did Destination Unknown (1933), and the English version of S.O.S. Iceberg (1933).

Garnett went to MGM where he had a huge success with China Seas (1935). He did She Couldn't Take It (1935) at Columbia.

In 1935 he announced his own production company. He took off around the world on a cruise to shoot footage for it. He returned in October 1936.

20th Century Fox
Garnett signed with Fox where he made Professional Soldier (1936), Love Is News (1937), and Slave Ship (1937). He did Stand-In (1937) for Walter Wagner.

Producing

Garnet turned producer as well as director with Joy of Living (1938) at RKO. He produced and directed then three films of Wanger: Trade Winds (1938) (based on his story), Eternally Yours (1939), and Slightly Honorable (1939). He provided a story for Cafe Hostess (1940), at Columbia.

At Universal he directed Seven Sinners (1940) with Marlene Dietrich and John Wayne.

He produced but did not direct two films at RKO, Unexpected Uncle (1941) and Weekend for Three (1941).

He directed  Cheers for Miss Bishop (1941) at UA, My Favorite Spy (1942) at RKO, and The Boy from Stalingrad (1942) at Columbia.

Radio 
He created the NBC Red comedy-detective radio program Three Sheets to the Wind (1942), which starred John Wayne as Dan O'Brien, an American private eye posing as a drunk on a luxury liner sailing from England in 1939, and Helga Moray, which ran for six months at 11:30pm Sunday nights. The show was intended by Garnett to be the pilot for a film, though the film was never made. A demonstration episode of the radio show with Brian Donlevy in the leading role exists. Wayne, not Donlevy, played the role throughout the series run on NBC.

MGM
Garnett went to MGM where he directed The Cross of Lorraine (1943), and Bataan (1943).  He did some second unit directing on Since You Went Away (1944) and uncredited directing on See Here, Private Hargrove (1944).

Garnett had some big hits with two Greer Garson films, Mrs. Parkington (1944), The Valley of Decision (1945), then made The Postman Always Rings Twice (1946), starring John Garfield and Lana Turner, which is probably his best known film.

Paramount and Howard Hughes
Garnett went to Paramount where he made Wild Harvest (1947), A Connecticut Yankee in King Arthur's Court (1949), starring Bing Crosby and Rhonda Fleming.

He wrote and directed a Mickey Rooney film, The Fireball (1950), based on his story. He went back to MGM to direct one of Loretta Young's last theatrical films, Cause for Alarm!, in 1951, and the adventure film Soldiers Three (1951).

Garnett went to RKO, then under the ownership of Howard Hughes to do some directing on The Racket (1951) and One Minute to Zero (1952).

He began working in TV with Four Star Theatre and made Main Street to Broadway (1953).

England
Garnett travelled to England to make The Black Knight (1954) with Alan Ladd. He worked on the hugely popular documentary Seven Wonders of the World (1956).

Television
Garnett returned to the US and worked increasingly on television, directing such shows as Screen Directors Playhouse (for which he also provided some stories), Alcoa Theatre, Goodyear Theatre, The Loretta Young Show, The Untouchables, and Overland Trail.

He directed a feature in Ireland, A Terrible Beauty (1960), with Robert Mitchum, then went back to TV: Wagon Train, Riverboat, The New Loretta Young Show, Frontier Circus, Laramie, Naked City, The Deputy, Whispering Smith, 87th Precinct, The Tall Man, Rawhide, Please Don't Eat the Daisies, Death Valley Days, The Beachcomber, Bonanza, The Loner, The Legend of Jesse James, and Gunsmoke.

He directed a feature, Guns of Wyoming (1963), with Robert Taylor. He also did some government films.

Later career
Garnett wrote, produced and directed The Delta Factor (1970). His last two films were Challenge to Be Free (1975) and Timber Tramps (1975).

Private life
Garnett married three actresses. First was Patsy Ruth Miller in Los Angeles on 8 September 1929. She filed for divorce which was granted 18 September 1933 on grounds of desertion while she was in Vienna, Austria and Garnett in London, England. While in London, Garnett met South African author Helga Moray whom he married on his yacht in November 1934. They had a second ceremony on 31 March 1935 in Yuma, Arizona to safeguard her American citizenship. Six months after their son, William John "Bill" Garnett was born, Moray filed for divorce on grounds of cruelty in 1942. Garnett then married Mari Aldon in London, England on 13 August 1953. Their daughter Tiela Aldon Garnett Daniels was born in Los Angeles on 25 October 1955.

Death
He died of leukemia at the Wadsworth Veterans Administration Hospital in Sawtelle, California, at the age of 83. His ashes were scattered on his Paso Robles ranch. He was survived by his two children. He has a star on the Hollywood Walk of Fame.

Filmography

Writer

 Broken Chains (1922)
 The Hottentot (1922)
 Who's Your Friend (1925)
 That's My Baby (1926)
 Up in Mabel's Room (1926)
 The Strong Man (1926)
 There You Are! (1926)
 The Cruise of the Jasper B (1926)
 Rubber Tires (1927)
 Getting Gertie's Garter (1927)
 White Gold (1927)
 Long Pants (1927)
 No Control (1927)
 The Wise Wife (1927)
 Turkish Delight (1927)
 Skyscraper (1928)
 The Cop (1928)
 Power (1928)
 Celebrity (1928)
 The Spieler (1928)
 The Flying Fool (1929)

Director

 The Spieler (1928)
 Celebrity (1928)
 The Flying Fool (1929)
 Oh, Yeah! (1929)
 Officer O'Brien (1930)
 Her Man (1930)
 Bad Company (1931)
 Prestige (1932)
 Panama Flo (1932, uncredited)
 Okay, America! (1932)
 One Way Passage (1932)
 Destination Unknown (1933)
 S.O.S. Iceberg (1933)
 China Seas (1935)
 She Couldn't Take It (1935)
 Professional Soldier (1935)
 Love Is News (1937)
 Slave Ship (1937)
 Stand-In (1937)
 Joy of Living (1938)
 Trade Winds (1938)
 Eternally Yours (1939)
 Slightly Honorable (1939)
 Seven Sinners (1940)
 Cheers for Miss Bishop (1941)
 My Favorite Spy (1942)
 The Boy from Stalingrad (1943, uncredited)
 Bataan (1943)
 The Cross of Lorraine (1943)
 Since You Went Away (1944, uncredited)
 Mrs. Parkington (1944)
 The Valley of Decision (1945)
 The Postman Always Rings Twice (1946)
 Wild Harvest (1947)
 A Connecticut Yankee in King Arthur's Court (1949)
 The Fireball (1950)
 Cause for Alarm! (1951)
 Soldiers Three (1951)
 The Racket (1951, uncredited)
 One Minute to Zero (1952)
 Main Street to Broadway (1953)
 The Black Knight (1954)
 Seven Wonders of the World (1956, documentary)
 A Terrible Beauty (1960)
 Cattle King (1963)
 The Delta Factor (1970)
 Challenge to Be Free (1975)
 Timber Tramps (1975)

Works

References

External links
 
 Family Photo Album – Tiela Aldon Garnett Daniels

1894 births
1977 deaths
20th-century American male writers
20th-century American screenwriters
American male screenwriters
American military personnel of World War I
American television directors
Deaths from cancer in California
Deaths from leukemia
Film directors from Los Angeles
German-language film directors
Screenwriters from California
United States Naval Aviators
Writers from Los Angeles